Melozone is a genus of mostly Neotropical birds in the family Passerellidae, found mainly in Mexico. Three species reach as far north as the southwestern United States, two species reach as far south as Costa Rica, and two are endemic to Mexico.

It is one of two genera containing birds with the common name towhee.

Species
The following species are in the genus Melozone:

References 

 
Bird genera
American sparrows
Taxonomy articles created by Polbot
Taxa named by Ludwig Reichenbach
Taxa described in 1850